Herman Naegels (born 17 March 1943) is a Belgian sprint canoer who competed in the late 1960s and early 1970s. Competing in two Summer Olympics, he earned his best finish of seventh in the K-2 1000 m event at Mexico City in 1968.

References

1943 births
Belgian male canoeists
Canoeists at the 1968 Summer Olympics
Canoeists at the 1972 Summer Olympics
Living people
Olympic canoeists of Belgium
20th-century Belgian people